The Prosperous Justice Party (sometimes called the Justice and Prosperity Party), frequently abbreviated to PKS, is an Islamist political party in Indonesia.

PKS is a metamorphosis from the Justice Party (PK) established in 1998. The party was originally influenced by the Muslim Brotherhood movement of Egypt, and considered an Islamist party for its calls for Islam to play a central role in public life, as well as providing political support to Indonesian Islamist movements such as the Islamic Defenders Front and 212 Movement. Today, it is considered a nationalist Islamist party that conforms with Pancasila doctrine and no longer upholds sharia as a main goal.

In 2019, the party obtained the popular vote by 8.21 percent, which is greater than 6.79 percent in 2014 and 7.88 percent in 2009. The party is currently led by Ahmad Syaikhu.

History

The origin of the party is a religious movement known as Jemaah Tarbiyah, which was influential in university campuses during the 1980s and 1990s. Activists of Jemaah Tarbiyah established the Justice Party, the predecessor of the party on 20 July 1998, with Nurmahmudi Ismail as its first president. The Justice Party was reconstituted as the Prosperous Justice Party in April 2002 after the Justice Party failed to meet the required two percent of electoral threshold in the 1999 election that it needed to contest the 2004 election. During the 2004 legislative elections, the PKS won 7.3% of the popular vote and 45 out of 550 seats, making it the seventh-largest party in parliament. This was a gain from the 1.4% received in 1999. In addition, its leader Hidayat Nur Wahid was elected speaker of the People's Consultative Assembly. PKS's strongest support is in major urban centers, particularly Jakarta, where it won the largest share of seats in 2004. In the 2009 elections, the party's came fourth, its share of the vote rose to 7.88% and it gained 12 extra legislative seats.

The PKS is known for its public opposition to political corruption; this stance was widely reported as a major factor in the party's increased success in 2004. However, this image has been under attack in recent times, as several alleged cases of grafts are suspected to be connected to several prominent party politicians. The party is closely associated with Islamic teachings, but according to its leadership does not promote the mandatory implementation of sharia, requiring Indonesia's Muslims to follow Islamic law. Many of its campaigns are based on conservative religious teachings, such as opposition to the selling of pornography, and for strict punishments for violations of narcotics laws.

The party has been associated with the Egypt-based Muslim Brotherhood; several of its founders attended Brotherhood-related schools. The organization stages rallies supporting Hamas in its conflict with Israel, and against the influence of the United States both in the Middle East and in Indonesia.

After the 2004 Indian Ocean tsunami, PKS sent volunteer relief workers to Aceh, and has been involved in several other relief and reconstruction projects.

Over the years, the party has experienced prolonged internal rivalry, particularly between camps that can be identified as pragmatist on the one hand, and idealist on the other. The pragmatist camp has generally been made up of younger, secular-educated functionaries while older functionaries who often are graduates from institutes in the Middle East make up the idealist camp.

The 5 October 2011 edition of Indonesian TV news program Liputan 6 Petang reported PKS Deputy Secretary-General and member of Indonesia's House of Representatives Fahri Hamzah had recently floated the idea of disbanding Indonesia's Corruption Eradication Commission (Komisi Pemberantasan Korupsi or KPK). According to Kompas, Deputy Chairman of Commission III in House of Representatives was responsible for legal affairs, human rights and security Fahri Hamzah first made the suggestion to disband the Corruption Eradication Commission in a consultation meeting at the House on Monday 3 October 2011.

The party saw rapid successions of party presidents in the 2010s. In 2013, Lutfi Hasan Ishaaq was arrested by the Corruption Eradication Commission due to graft; Anis Matta was chosen to replace him as party president and finally, Taufik Ridho succeeded Matta as secretary general. Taufik Ridho died of medical complications on 6 February 2017 at 52 years of age.

After rejecting State Capital Act (UU IKN) and the Criminal Offense Bill of Sexual Abuses (RUU TPKS) in 2021 and 2022 as well as supporting Suharto as National Hero in 2008, the some members of the public called for the dissolution of PKS.

Party platform
The party's vision is to bring about a civil society that is just, prosperous and dignified.

Its mission is to:

 Pioneer reforms to the political system, government and the bureaucracy, the judicial system and the military to be committed to strengthening democracy.
 Address poverty, reduce unemployment and improve the prosperity of all elements of society through a strategy to equalize incomes, high value-added growth and sustained development.
 Move towards just education by providing the maximum possible opportunities for all the Indonesian people.

Party figures

Election results

Legislative election results

Presidential election results

Note: Bold text suggests the party's member

See also
Politics of Indonesia

Notes

References

 
Anti-Shi'ism
Anti-LGBT sentiment
Antisemitism in Asia
Organizations that oppose LGBT rights
1998 establishments in Indonesia
Islamism in Indonesia
Political parties established in 1998
Political parties in Indonesia
Islamic political parties in Indonesia
Muslim Brotherhood
Social conservative parties
Sunni Islamist groups